Mira Kaskinen  (born 4 July 1991) is a Finnish ski orienteering competitor.

She won a silver medal in the long distance at the 2015 World Ski Orienteering Championships, behind Josefine Engström. She placed fourth in the middle distance at the 2015 Championships, in a close race, only three seconds behind gold medalist Milka Reponen.

References

External links
 
 Mira Kaskinen at World of O Runners

1991 births
Living people
Finnish orienteers
Ski-orienteers